The Bishop of Clifton is the Ordinary of the Roman Catholic Diocese of Clifton in the Province of Birmingham, England.

The see is in the suburb of Clifton in the city of Bristol where the bishop's seat is located at the Cathedral Church of SS. Peter and Paul. The bishop of Clifton has jurisdiction over the counties of Gloucestershire, Somerset and Wiltshire and the city of Bristol.

The current bishop is the Right Reverend Declan Ronan Lang, who was appointed the 9th Bishop of Clifton on 27 February 2001 and consecrated on 28 March 2001. Bishop Lang has taken for his motto Evangelii Nuntiandi meaning "Proclaim the Gospel". When asked why he had chosen this, he said, "It is the opening words from an Apostolic Exhortation of Paul Vl made on 8 December 1975, it is simply, one of the most important statements for the Church in this modern age."

History
The Apostolic Vicariate of the Western District was created on 30 January 1688 and consisted of the counties of Cornwall, Devon, Dorset, Gloucestershire, Herefordshire, Somerset and Wiltshire, together with all of the principality of Wales. In 1840, the Western District lost territory on the creation of the Welsh District. On the restoration of the Catholic hierarchy in England and Wales by Pope Pius IX in 1850, the Western District was divided into the dioceses of Clifton and Plymouth.

List of bishops of Clifton

References

Bibliography

External links
Diocese of Clifton (The Original Catholic Encyclopedia)

 Clif